Richmond Avenue is a major north-south thoroughfare on Staten Island, New York.

Street description 
Richmond Avenue begins at Tennyson Drive and Crescent Beach Park bordering Raritan Bay. Hylan Boulevard is the first major intersection,  to the north. After intersecting Amboy Road and then crossing under the Staten Island Railway, Richmond Avenue continues north to Arthur Kill Road. A tenth of a mile later, the avenue intersects with the end of Korean War Veterans Parkway (formerly Richmond Parkway). Richmond Avenue then crosses over Richmond Creek on the Fresh Kills Bridge, gains a median divider, and passes between the Staten Island Mall and Freshkills Park. Richmond Avenue intersects Rockland Avenue and Draper Place in New Springville before traveling along the edge of Willowbrook Park.

Richmond Avenue continues north to the intersection with Victory Boulevard. Richmond Avenue intersects Lamberts Lane, a road with access to the Brooklyn-bound Staten Island Expressway (I-278). Goethals Road North, a road that parallels the expressway, then begins to the left. This is the northern terminus of Richmond Avenue as a major two-way street. North of Forest Avenue, most traffic continues north to Richmond Terrace via Morningstar Road, while Richmond Avenue diverges to the east as a narrow one-way residential street. Richmond Avenue ends at Willow Road West, a service road for NY Route 440, two blocks east of Morningstar Road.

History 
 

The road is one of the older ones on Staten Island, presumably dating back to the early-to-mid-19th century. Early writings and periodicals refer to Richmond Avenue as the road from Port Richmond to New Springville, just north of the Fresh Kills. Sections of road along what is currently Richmond Avenue were known by various names, such as Old Stone Road and Church Road (in Port Richmond), Bridge Avenue (south to Arthur Kill Road), Eltingville Road (continuing south to Amboy Road), and Seaside Avenue (the final section). In 1912, they were all consolidated as "Richmond Avenue". In 1964, the construction of the Willowbrook Expressway divided Richmond Avenue into two sections, the northern segment being later renamed Port Richmond Avenue. 

In the 1920s and 1930s, most of Richmond Avenue, particularly south of Victory Boulevard, was predominantly farmland. The road itself was merely one-lane wide. However, indicative of the economic transformation the Richmond Avenue corridor of Staten Island experienced, specifically with the opening of the Staten Island Mall in 1972, the roadway was widened. The roadway from Rockland Avenue to Forest Hill Road has been widened to an eight-lane thoroughfare (four lanes each way), while other sections are two and three lanes wide.		

Prior to the construction of any expressway on Staten Island, Richmond Avenue, north of Drumgoole Boulevard, was designated New York Route 440, which it held until the West Shore Expressway was completed in 1976.

Public transportation 
Richmond Avenue is served in its entirety by the S59 local/S89 limited bus routes. The portion from Forest Avenue to Yukon Avenue is served by the S44/S94 route. The portion south of the Staten Island Mall is also served by the S79 SBS bus.
The  express buses to Manhattan cover the northern portion of Richmond Avenue, the  cover the portion from Lamberts Lane to Arthur Kill Road, and the  cover the southern portion of Richmond Avenue.

Major intersections

References

Streets in Staten Island